Glacis Road is a road in northern end of the British Overseas Territory of Gibraltar, the southwestern end of which is the junction with the Waterport Roundabout, where Waterport Road and Queensway also intersect. From the roundabout, Glacis Road extends to the northeast. At its mid portion, the road intersects with Bayside Road, at which point it changes course to a southeast direction. Its eastern end intersects with Winston Churchill Avenue. The North District office of the Royal Gibraltar Post Office is located on Glacis Road.

References

Streets in Gibraltar